Mohamed Amin Romdhana (born 27 January 1993) is a Tunisian athlete specialising in the pole vault. He has won multiple medals at continental level, including three at African Championships and one at the African Games, and twice represented Africa at the Continental Cup.

His personal bests in the event are 5.40 metres outdoors (Radés 2017) and 5.35 metres indoors (Niort 2017). Both are current national records.

International competitions

1Representing Africa

References

1993 births
Living people
Tunisian male pole vaulters
Athletes (track and field) at the 2015 African Games
African Games medalists in athletics (track and field)
African Games bronze medalists for Tunisia
African Championships in Athletics winners
Islamic Solidarity Games competitors for Tunisia
20th-century Tunisian people
21st-century Tunisian people